The sphenoid bone is an unpaired bone of the neurocranium. It is situated in the middle of the skull towards the front, in front of the basilar part of the occipital bone. The sphenoid bone is one of the seven bones that articulate to form the orbit. Its shape somewhat resembles that of a butterfly or bat with its wings extended.

Structure

It is divided into the following parts:
 a median portion, known as the body of sphenoid bone, containing the sella turcica, which houses the pituitary gland as well as the paired paranasal sinuses, the sphenoidal sinuses
 two greater wings on the lateral side of the body and two lesser wings from the anterior side.
 Pterygoid processes of the sphenoides, directed downwards from the junction of the body and the greater wings.

Two sphenoidal conchae are situated at the anterior and inferior part of the body.

Intrinsic ligaments of the sphenoid 
The more important of these are: 
 the pterygospinous, stretching between the spina angularis and the lateral pterygoid plate (see cervical fascia); 
 the interclinoid, a fibrous process joining the anterior to the posterior clinoid process; 
 and the caroticoclinoid, connecting the anterior to the middle clinoid process.

These ligaments occasionally ossify.

Features
 pterygoid notch
 pterygoid fossa
 scaphoid fossa
 pterygoid hamulus
 pterygoid canal
 pterygospinous process
 sella turcica

Articulations
The sphenoid articulates with the frontal, parietal, ethmoid, temporal, zygomatic, palatine, vomer, and occipital bones and helps to connect the neurocranium to the facial skeleton.

Body of sphenoid

Superior or cerebral surface

Articulates with ethmoid bone anteriorly and basilar part of occipital bone posteriorly.
It shows:
 Jugum sphenoidale
 Sulcus chiasmaticus
 Tuberculum sellae
 Sella turcica
 Dorsum sellae
 Clivus

Inferior surface

 Rostrum of sphenoid
 Sphenoidal conchae
 Vaginal processes of medial pterygoid plate

Anterior surface

Sphenoidal crest articulates with the perpendicular plate of ethmoid leading to formation of a part of the septum of nose.

Posterior surface

Basilar part of occipital bone

Lateral surface

Carotid sulcus lodging cavernous sinus and internal carotid artery

Sphenoidal sinuses
Sphenoidal sinuses are asymmetrical air sinuses in the body of the sphenoid, closed by sphenoidal conchae.

Greater wings

Superior or cerebral surface

This forms the floor of the middle cranial fossa.  It presents (starting from the front):
 foramen rotundum
 foramen ovale
Sphenoidal emissary foramen
 foramen spinosum

Lateral surface

This is divided into (by infratemporal crest):
 Upper or temporal surface
 Lower or infratemporal surface

Foramen pierce it:
 Foramen ovale
 Foramen spinosum

Orbital surface
This forms the posterior wall of the orbit

Lesser wings
These are two triangular wings projecting laterally from anterosuperior part of the body.  Each consists of:
 A base forming medial end of the wing.
 Tip forming the lateral end of the wing.
 Superior surface forming floor of anterior cranial fossa.
 Inferior surface forming upper boundary of superior orbital fissure.
 Posterior surface projects into the Sylvian point.
 Medially, terminates in the anterior clinoid process.

Development

Until the seventh or eighth month of fetal development, the body of the sphenoid consists of two parts: one in front of the tuberculum sellæ, the presphenoid, with which the small wings are continuous; the other, consisting of the sella turcica and dorsum sellae, the postsphenoid, with which are associated the great wings, and pterygoid processes.

The greater part of the bone is ossified in cartilage. There are fourteen centers in all, six for the presphenoid and eight for the postsphenoid.

Presphenoid 
By about the ninth week of fetal development an ossific center appears for each of the small wings (orbito-sphenoids) just lateral to the optic foramen; this is followed by the appearance of two nuclei in the presphenoid part of the body.

The sphenoidal conchae are each developed from a center that makes its appearance about the fifth month; at birth they consist of small triangular laminae, and it is not until the third year that they become hollowed out and coneshaped; about the fourth year they fuse with the labyrinths of the ethmoid bone, and between the ninth and twelfth years they unite with the sphenoid bone.

Postsphenoid 
The first ossific nuclei are those for the great wings (alisphenoids). One makes its appearance in each wing between the foramen rotundum and foramen ovale about the eighth week. The orbital plate and that part of the sphenoid, which is found in the temporal fossa, as well as the lateral pterygoid plate, are ossified in membrane (Fawcett).

Soon after, the centers for the postsphenoid part of the body appear, one on either side of the sella turcica, and become blended together about the middle of fetal life.

Each medial pterygoid plate (except its hamulus) is ossified in membrane, and its center probably appears about the ninth or tenth week; the hamulus becomes chondrified during the third month, and almost at once ossifies (Fawcett).

The medial joins the lateral pterygoid plate about the sixth month.

About the fourth month, a center appears for each lingula and speedily joins the rest of the bone.

The presphenoid is united to the postsphenoid about the eighth month, and at birth the sphenoid is in three pieces [Fig. 4]: a central, consisting of the body and small wings, and two lateral, each comprising a great wing and pterygoid process.

In the first year after birth the great wings and body unite, and the small wings extend inward above the anterior part of the body, and, meeting with each other in the middle line, form an elevated smooth surface, termed the jugum sphenoidale.

By the twenty-fifth year the sphenoid and occipital are completely fused.

Between the pre- and postsphenoid there are occasionally seen the remains of a canal, the canalis cranio-pharyngeus, through which, in early fetal life, the hypophyseal diverticulum of the buccal ectoderm is transmitted.

The sphenoidal sinuses are present as minute cavities at the time of birth (Onodi), but do not attain their full size until after puberty.

Function
This bone assists with the formation of the base and the sides of the skull, and the floors and walls of the orbits. It is the site of attachment for most of the muscles of mastication. Many foramina and fissures are located in the sphenoid that carry nerves and blood vessels of the head and neck, such as the superior orbital fissure (with ophthalmic nerve), foramen rotundum (with maxillary nerve) and foramen ovale (with mandibular nerve).

Other animals

The sphenoid bone of humans is homologous with a number of bones that are often separate in other animals, and have a somewhat complex arrangement.

In the early lobe-finned fishes and tetrapods, the pterygoid bones were flat, wing-like bones forming the major part of the roof of the mouth.  Above the pterygoids were the epipterygoid bones, which formed part of a flexible joint between the braincase and the palatal region, as well as extending a vertical bar of bone towards the roof of the skull. Between the pterygoids lay an elongated, narrow parasphenoid bone, which also spread over some of the lower surface of the braincase, and connected, at its forward end, with a sphenethmoid bone helping to protect the olfactory nerves. Finally, the basisphenoid bone formed part of the floor of the braincase and lay immediately above the parasphenoid.

Aside from the loss of the flexible joint at the rear of the palate, this primitive pattern is broadly retained in reptiles, albeit with some individual modifications. In birds, the epipterygoids are absent and the pterygoids considerably reduced. Living amphibians have a relatively simplified skull in this region; a broad parasphenoid forms the floor of the braincase, the pterygoids are relatively small, and all other related bones except the sphenethmoid are absent.

In mammals, these various bones are often (though not always) fused into a single structure; the sphenoid. The basisphenoid forms the posterior part of the base, while the pterygoid processes represent the pterygoid bones. The epipterygoids have extended into the wall of the cranium; they are referred to as alisphenoids when separate in mammals, and form the greater wings of the sphenoid when fused into a larger structure. The sphenethmoid bone forms as three bones: the lesser wings and the anterior part of the base. These two parts of the sphenethmoid may be distinguished as orbitosphenoids and presphenoid, respectively, although there is often some degree of fusion. Only the parasphenoid appears to be entirely absent in mammals.

In the dog the sphenoid is represented by 8 bones: basisphenoid, alisphenoids, presphenoid, orbitosphenoids, pterygoids. These bones remain separate and are the:
2 Alisphenoids: each greater wing
2 Orbitosphenoids: each lesser wing
Basisphenoid: back part of body
Presphenoid: front part of body
2 Pterygoids: medial pterygoid plate

Additional images

See also

Sphenoidal sinus
Pterygospinal ligament
Basilar skull fracture

Notes

References

External links
 - "Lateral view of skull."

Bones of the head and neck